Vierendrra Lalit (born in village Dhimahi, Bulendshehr, U.P, on 16 March 1969 ) is an Indian-born cinematographer and film director. He has worked in Indian Hindi and  Telugu film industries as well as in Malaysian cinema. He owns two film production companies called Roop Chitra Visual and Roop Chitra Films.

He is a member of Western India Cinematographers Association (WICA), Indian Film & Television Directors’ Association (IFTDA), Indian Documentary Producers Association (IDPA), Film worker association of Malaysia (PPFM) and Western India Film Producers' Association (WIFPA).

Early life
Lalit was born to a family of freedom fighters and social activists. His grandfather, Sohan Pal Singh, was a farmer, social activist, and freedom fighter, who actively participated in the Quit India Movement in 1942 and was arrested several times. His father, Dr Roop Kishore is a retired scientist in genetics and plant breeding. He was a professor in Chandra Shekhar Azad University of Agriculture and Technology, Kanpur, Uttar Pradesh. His mother, Chitra Verma is a home maker, artist and his biggest inspiration.

Lalit completed his schooling at Sainik School, in Lucknow and received a Masters in Philosophy from DAV College,Kanpur(U.P) Kanpur University.

Personal life
Vierendrra Lalit is married to Rachna Lalit, who is into Research and Writing of Films and Documentaries. She is also a Producer in Bollywood Industry. They both have two kids, Khoobi Lalit and Varenyam Lalit.

Career 
After receiving his diploma in photography, Lalit went to Mumbai and joined cinematographer Kabir Lal as an apprentice. He assisted Lal on films such as Kaho Na Pyaar Hai, Taal, Hum Aapke Dil Main Rahte Hai, Humara Dil Aapke Paas Hai, and Prem Aggan, Khauff. Lalit also assisted cinematographer Johny Lal in the movie Mujhe Kuch Kehna Hai.

In 2001, Lalit began working independently. To date, he has worked in 21 feature films, 150 Music videos, 130 Documentaries/Corporates and over 600 Ad films and TV commercials as well.

Credits

Advertisements 
 Tata Nano
 Neesa Basmati Rice
 Lucknow Metro
 India Gate Basmati Rice
 Double Bull Basmati Rice
 Escorts Tractor
 Doon Basmati Rice
 Bubbles Baby Baby Products
 Preet Tractors and Combine
 Nature’s Essence Neem and Aloe Vera facewash
 GLINT Bath Assets
 Clair Lighting
 Royal soap (cool lime)
 RR Ilaichi
 RR Masala
 Royal Saffron Sandal Soap
 Aarti Pan Masala
 Royal HE-MAN Soap
 Oxyglow Fairness Cream
 Joy Of Giving
 Oxyglow Hair Tonic
 Kulfi Ice Cream (London)
 Dakini Peanut Butter
 Dakini Cashew Butter
 Dakini Almond Butter
 Dakini Sunflower Magic
 Smart Gutka
 Good Sleep Mosquito Coil
 Nestech Office Shutter Lockers
 Royale Glucose Biscuits

References

External links
 
 YouTube channel
 
 
 
 

Hindi film cinematographers
Hindi-language film directors
1969 births
People from Bulandshahr district
Living people
Sainik School alumni
Cinematographers from Uttar Pradesh